Stefan Cohn-Vossen  (28 May 1902 – 25 June 1936) was a mathematician, who was responsible for Cohn-Vossen's inequality and the Cohn-Vossen transformation is also named for him. He proved the first version of the splitting theorem.

He was also known for his collaboration with David Hilbert on the 1932 book Anschauliche Geometrie, translated into English as Geometry and the Imagination.

He was born in Breslau (then a city in the Kingdom of Prussia; now Wrocław in Poland). He wrote a 1924 doctoral dissertation at the University of Breslau (now the University of Wrocław) under the supervision of Adolf Kneser. He became a professor at the University of Cologne in 1930.

He was barred from lecturing in 1933 under Nazi racial legislation, because he was Jewish. In 1934 he emigrated to the USSR, with some help from Herman Müntz. While there, he taught at Leningrad University. He died in Moscow from pneumonia.

See also 

 Cohn-Vossen's inequality

References

External links
 Anschauliche Geometrie at Göttinger Digitalisierungszentrum
 Cohn-Vossen transformation at Encyclopedia of Mathematics

1902 births
1936 deaths
20th-century German mathematicians
Differential geometers
Jewish refugees from Nazi Germany in the Soviet Union
People from the Province of Silesia
Soviet mathematicians
University of Breslau alumni
Academic staff of the University of Cologne
Deaths from pneumonia in the Soviet Union